The list of shipwrecks in April 1883 includes ships sunk, foundered, grounded, or otherwise lost during April 1883.

2 April

3 April

4 April

5 April

7 April

8 April

10 April

11 April

12 April

13 April

14 April

17 April

18 April

19 April

20 April

22 April

24 April

25 April

26 April

28 April

29 April

30 April

Unknown date

References

1883-04
Maritime incidents in April 1883